The AN/FPS-108 COBRA DANE  is a PESA phased array radar installation operated by Raytheon for the United States Space Force (originally for the United States Air Force) at Eareckson Air Station on the island of Shemya, Aleutian Islands, Alaska. The system was built in 1976 and brought online in 1977 for the primary mission of gathering intelligence about Russia's ICBM program in support of verification of the SALT II arms limitation treaty. Its single face  diameter phased array radar antenna  faces the Kamchatka Peninsula and Russia's Kura Test Range. COBRA DANE operates in the 1215–1400 MHz band.

The "COBRA" designation indicates a general Defense Intelligence program.

Description
It initially employed a Control Data Corporation Cyber 74 mainframe computer for data processing.
Data from the radar is sent to the North American Aerospace Defense Command (NORAD) at Peterson Space Force Base, Colorado. It is also listed as a partner of the NASA Orbital Debris Program Office and works with the Missile Defense Agency, under the control of the 21st Operations Group.

The Cobra Dane radar has been upgraded to be integrated in the Missile Defenses Agency's (MDA) Ballistic Missile Defense System (BMDS). The improvement includes midcourse BMDS sensor coverage by providing acquisition, tracking, object classification, and data that can be used for cueing, launch of interceptor missiles, and course updates of interceptors while retaining the site's legacy intelligence and space track missions. The Space Force maintains responsibility for the Cobra Dane radar operations, maintenance, and sustainment.

Technical specifications
Traveling wave tube l-fed phased-array, all-weather, long-range radar 
Provides midcourse coverage for the Ballistic Missile Defense System. Detects sea-launched or intercontinental ballistic missiles; Classifies reentry vehicles and other missile objects. Provides real-time information to Fire Control.
Provides tracking of threat ballistic missiles sufficiently accurate to commit the launch of interceptors and to update the target tracks to the interceptor while the interceptor is in flight
Has one radar face providing 136° of azimuth coverage. The radar face is approximately 95 feet in diameter; overall radar height is 120 feet.  Detects objects out to 2000 miles.  It operates in the L-band frequency.

See also

Cobra Ball
Cobra Eye
AN/SPQ-11 Cobra Judy
PAVE PAWS
BMEWS
Eareckson Air Station, Shemya island, Alaska
Specific US radar and locations
Thule Air Base, Greenland
Clear Space Force Station, Alaska
RAF Fylingdales, United Kingdom
Cape Cod Space Force Station, Massachusetts
Beale Air Force Base, California
Cavalier Air Force Station, North Dakota

References

External links
 National Security Space Roadmap COBRA DANE Overview
 NASA Orbital Debris Program Office
 Raytheon – Upgrades, etc.
 Space Surveillance Sensors: The Cobra Dane Radar. Article at the Mostlymissiledefence Blog.

1977 establishments in Alaska
Buildings and structures in Aleutians West Census Area, Alaska
Cobra radars
Ground radars
United States Space Surveillance Network
Radar networks
Equipment of the United States Space Force
Military equipment introduced in the 1970s